Harry Edward Lamb (3 June 1925 – 9 August 1982) was an English footballer, who played as an inside forward in the Football League for Tranmere Rovers.

References

External links

Tranmere Rovers F.C. players
Association football inside forwards
English Football League players
1925 births
1982 deaths
English footballers